Edward William Seager (8 May 1828 – 14 July 1922) was a notable New Zealand policeman, gaoler and asylum superintendent.

Early life
Seager was born in London, England, in 1828.

Career 
Seager began his career as a porter in a London law firm. After the death of his mother Seager began work as a policeman and assistant immigration officer under the tutelage of an old friend, James Fitzgerald. Because Seager lacked a solid education and social status he found difficulty in achieving promotions.

In 1857, Seager was promoted to sub-inspector. Seager was known for his sense of humor and would routinely play practical jokes on prisoners under his watch. In 1862, Seager was promoted to warden of Lyttelton Gaol, an asylum. In 1863 Seager convinced the Canterbury Provincial Council to open a new asylum, Canterbury Asylum, later known as Sunnyside Hospital.

References

1828 births
1922 deaths
New Zealand police officers
English emigrants to New Zealand
People from London
New Zealand people in health professions